SMS Triglav was one of six s built for the  (Austro-Hungarian Navy) shortly before the First World War. Completed in August 1914, the ship participated in an unsuccessful attempt to recapture a small island in the Central Adriatic Sea from the Italians in July 1915. In November and early December Triglav was one of the ships conducting raids off the Albanian coast to interdict the supply lines between Italy and Albania. She was crippled by a mine during the 1st Battle of Durazzo in late December, but was taken in tow. The ship had to be abandoned when the Austro-Hungarian ships were spotted on the return voyage and she was sunk by French destroyers.

Design and description

The Tátra-class destroyers were faster, more powerfully armed and more than twice as large as the preceding . The ships had a complement of 105 officers and enlisted men.

The Tátras were powered by two AEG-Curtiss steam turbine sets, each driving a single propeller shaft using steam provided by six Yarrow boilers. Four of the boilers were oil-fired while the remaining pair used coal.

The main armament of the Tátra-class destroyers consisted of two Škoda Works  K10 guns, one each fore and aft of the superstructure in single mounts. Their secondary armament consisted of six  guns, two of which were on anti-aircraft mountings. They were also equipped with four  torpedo tubes in two twin rotating mountings amidships.

Construction and career
Triglav was laid down by Ganz-Danubius at their shipyard in Porto Ré in the Kingdom of Croatia-Slavonia of the Austro-Hungarian Empire on 1 August 1912, launched on 22 December 1913 and completed on 8 August 1914. The Tátra-class ships did not play a significant role in the minor raids and skirmishing in the Adriatic in 1914 and early 1915 between the Entente Cordiale and the Central Powers. From 9 November to 12 December, Triglav had her propeller shaft bearings replaced.

Bombardment of Ancona

The Kingdom of Italy signed a secret treaty in London in late April 1915 breaking its alliance with the German Empire and Austro-Hungary and promising to declare war on the Central Powers within a month. Austro-Hungarian intelligence discovered this and Admiral Anton Haus, commander of the Austro-Hungarian Navy, planned a massive surprise attack on Italian ports and facilities on the Northern Adriatic coast, outside of interception range of the modern ships of the  stationed at Taranto. During the bombardment, Triglav screened the ships involved.

Despite a heavy bombardment by the ships, the 108-man landing party was unable to overcome the 90-man garrison and was forced to withdraw.

The Bulgarian declaration of war on Serbia on 14 October cut the existing supply line from Serbia to Salonika, Greece, and forced the Allies to begin supplying Serbia through ports in Albania. This took about a month to work out the details and the Austro-Hungarians took just about as long to decide on a response. Admiral Anton Haus, commander of the Austro-Hungarian Navy, ordered  (Captain) Heinrich Seitz, Helgolands commander, to take his ship, Saida and all six Tátra-class destroyers on a reconnaissance mission off the Albanian coast on the night of 22/23 November. They encountered and sank a small cargo ship and a motor schooner carrying flour for Serbia; four Italian destroyers were unable to intercept them before they reached friendly territory. On 6 December, Helgoland and the Tátras swept down the coast to Durazzo, sinking five motor schooners, including two in Durazzo harbor.

1st Battle of Durazzo

If they were not found he was to arrive at Durazzo at dawn and destroy any ships found there. He was unable to find the destroyers and dutifully arrived off Durazzo at dawn. At 07:30 he ordered four of his destroyers into the harbor to sink the cargo ship and two schooners anchored there while Helgoland engaged the coastal artillery defending the port. A well-camouflaged  artillery battery opened fire at 08:00 at point-blank range. While maneuvering to avoid its fire, Triglav and Lika entered a minefield. After striking two mines in quick succession, Lika sank at 08:03 and Triglav was crippled when her boiler rooms flooded after hitting one mine. After she was maneuvered out of the minefield, Csepel attempted to pass a towline, but it got tangled in one of her propellers, badly damaging it. Tátra was finally successful in securing a tow at 09:30, but was limited to a speed of  when Seitz led his ships northwards. He radioed for assistance at 10:35 and was informed an hour later that the armored cruiser  and four torpedo boats were en route to support him.

Italian observers had spotted Seitz's ships at 07:00 and the Allied quick-reaction force of the British light cruiser  and the Italian scout cruiser , escorted by five French destroyers, sortied in an attempt to cut off the Austro-Hungarian ships from their base at Cattaro. These were followed two hours later by the Italian scout cruiser , the British light cruiser  and four Italian destroyers. Seitz had ordered Triglavs crew taken off before any of the columns of smoke from these ships were spotted by his ships and he ordered Tátra to drop her tow at 13:15 and abandon Triglav. Five minutes later the Austro-Hungarian ships were spotted and the French destroyers were ordered to deal with Triglav at 13:38 while the cruisers pursued Seitz's ships. He was surprised when there was no return fire and decided to sink her with gunfire rather than expending torpedoes. This took over half-an-hour and left his ships well out of position for the pursuit of the other Austro-Hungarian ships.

Notes

Citations

Bibliography
 

 
 

Tátra-class destroyers
1913 ships